WKJO-LP (102.7 FM) was a radio station licensed to Brooksville, Florida, United States. The station was owned by Landmark Baptist Church. The station's license was cancelled by the FCC on October 31, 2011, as the station had been silent for more than a year.

References

External links
 

KJO-LP
KJO-LP
Defunct radio stations in the United States
Radio stations established in 2004
2004 establishments in Florida
Radio stations disestablished in 2011
2011 disestablishments in Florida
Defunct religious radio stations in the United States
KJO-LP